Babu Chiri Sherpa (June 22, 1965 – April 29, 2001) was a Sherpa mountaineer from Nepal. He reached the summit of Mount Everest ten times. 

He held two world records on Everest. He spent 21 hours on the summit of Everest without auxiliary oxygen, a record which still stands, and he made the fastest ascent of Everest in 16 hours and 56 minutes. An accomplished mountaineer, his life dream was to build schools in Nepal.

Early life
Babu Chiri Sherpa was born in Taksindu, a small Sherpa village near Salleri, the headquarters of Solukhumbu District in Nepal. As a child he spent most of his time helping his parents on their farm. Babu Chiri received no formal education as no schools existed in his or surrounding villages.  

Babu had taught himself to read, and his life dream was to build a school.
  
As a boy, Chiri was amazed by the mountains that surrounded his village. Many Sherpas support themselves by guiding and portering in the mountains. The legend of Tenzing Norgay, and Norgay himself, influenced Chiri.

Mountaineering
He began his career as a climber at the age of 16 when he procured a job as a trekking porter. On his first portering assignment he scaled the Ambhu Labtsa pass. He summited Mera Peak (6472 m) in four hours in 1985. Chiri eventually found work portering for Everest expeditions, and eventually reached the summit of Everest ten times. In May 1999, he spent a record 21 hours on the summit without supplementary oxygen, and without sleeping.

He also went on some expeditions to Cho Oyu.

Other
Babu Chiri spoke Sherpa, Nepali, English and Hindi. He traveled to Canada, China, Italy, Mexico, Pakistan and the United States.

Family
He has six daughters, four granddaughters: Michele, Amira, Sara, Jenica; and two grandsons: Chhewang and Urgen.

Death

In 2001, Chiri signed on for his eleventh Everest expedition. He was planning another bid for the summit. On April 29, while near Camp II (6,500 m) and apparently taking photographs, Chiri fell into a crevasse, and died.

Legacy

Chiri was an environmentalist and a humanitarian. He worked to have a school built in his home village; the school was completed before his death. On September 25, 2005, the Royal Nepali Government, as represented by the Crown Prince, inaugurated the Babu Chiri Memorial Museum and erected a statue of Chiri. The museum and statue were both built by the Everest Summiteers Association (ESA) with financial contributions from the government, local businesses, social organizations and individuals. The museum and statue are located in Til Ganga, Kathmandu.

Summits/expeditions
Everest
October 6, 1990
May 22, 1991
October 10, 1993
May 14, 1995
May 26, 1995
May 23, 1996
May 21, 1997
May 6, 1999
May 26, 1999
May 21, 2000

See also
List of people who died climbing Mount Everest
List of Mount Everest summiters by number of times to the summit
List of Mount Everest records

References

External links
Biography, EverestNews.com; accessed February 14, 2018.

1965 births
2001 deaths
People from Solukhumbu District
Sherpa summiters of Mount Everest
Mountaineering deaths on Mount Everest
Nepalese mountain climbers
Nepalese Buddhists
Deceased Everest summiters